Hispar Muztagh is a sub-range of the Karakoram mountain range. It is located in the Nagar District of Gilgit-Baltistan, Pakistan, north of Hispar Glacier, south of Shimshal Valley, and east of the Hunza Valley. It is the second highest sub-range of the Karakoram, the highest being the Baltoro Muztagh. The highest mountain in the range is Distaghil Sar (7,885m/25,869 ft).

Selected peaks in the Hispar Muztagh

Note
  These are from the Himalayan Index, which may not be completely accurate, as some climbs may not have been recorded in the climbing literature or indexed properly.

Sources

Jerzy Wala, Orographical Sketch Map of the Karakoram, Swiss Foundation for Alpine Research, Zurich, 1990.

External links 
Blankonthemap The Northern Kashmir WebSite
A labeled Google Earth image of Hispar Muztagh Range

Mountain ranges of the Karakoram
Mountain ranges of Gilgit-Baltistan
Hunza District